Devaughn Williamson (born 22 December 1997) is a Bahamian footballer who plays as a defender for United FC and the Bahamas national football team.

International career
In March 2015, Devaughn made his debut for the Bahamas in a World Cup qualifying match against Bermuda.

Personal life

Williamson was born to Philaseta and Conrad Williamson in the Bahamas. His brother, Donovan, is a beach soccer player, who was part of the Bahamian team that competed 2015 CONCACAF Beach Soccer Championship. Williamson is studying maritime operations at the University of the Bahamas. Despite being sundered by following separate careers, they both had entered in the same college and were 2014 graduates of Aquinas College. Williamson has also partaken in the Templeton World Charity Foundation Laws of Life essay competition in his time at Aguinas College Nassau.

His parents are Philaseta and Conrad Williamson.

References

1997 births
Living people
Bahamian footballers
Bahamas international footballers
Association football defenders
BFA Senior League players